Mihaela Buzărnescu (born 	4 May 1988) is a Romanian professional tennis player.

She has a career-high WTA singles ranking of No. 20, achieved on 6 August 2018. Her best doubles ranking of world No. 24, she reached on 22 October 2018. She has won one singles title and two doubles titles on the WTA Tour.

Buzărnescu has a Ph.D. in sports science from the National University of Physical Education and Sport.

Career highlights

Junior success
Buzărnescu played her first professional match in 2004. She then won the junior doubles title at the 2006 US Open with Raluca Olaru. Seeded No. 2, they defeated the top-seeded pair of Sharon Fichman and Anastasia Pavlyuchenkova in the final.

Injuries and hiatus
Shoulder and knee injuries (the latter prompting two surgeries) forced her off the pro tour for years, long enough that she went back to school, graduating a doctorate at the National University of Physical Education and Sport in December 2016.

2017–2018: Grand Slam & top 100 debut, first WTA Tour titles, world No. 20
In 2017, she qualified to make her Grand Slam main draw debut at the 2017 US Open (tennis).
In October 2017, Buzărnescu got to the semifinals of the Linz Open.

In 2018, she reached the finals of the Hobart International and the Prague Open.
At the Internationaux de Strasbourg, she surrendered a lead in the singles semifinals against Dominika Cibulková, eventually losing the match in three sets. She showed more consistency in the doubles, winning the tournament and her first WTA title with compatriot Raluca Olaru in straight sets against Nadiia Kichenok and Anastasia Rodionova.

Buzărnescu then played her first French Open, which was also the first Grand Slam tournament, she was seeded. She defeated Vania King in the first round for her first Grand Slam win. Afterwards, she also won versus Rebecca Peterson. Against No. 4 seed Elina Svitolina in the third round, Buzărnescu won the match in straight sets. This was her biggest career victory and one of the tournament's bigger upsets. She faced No. 13 seed Madison Keys in the fourth round, and lost in two sets.

In the grass-court season, Buzărnescu reached the quarterfinals of the Nature Valley Open in Nottingham, losing to Naomi Osaka. She also played in the doubles tournament with British partner Heather Watson, losing in the final.
At the Birmingham Classic, she once again defeated No. 2 seed Svitolina before losing to eventual champion Petra Kvitová in the semifinals.
Buzărnescu then played for a third consecutive week in Eastbourne. She reached the last 16 before losing to Jeļena Ostapenko. However, she reached the doubles final with partner Irina-Camelia Begu.

In August, Buzărnescu captured her first WTA Tour singles title winning in San Jose with a straight-sets victory over Maria Sakkari in the final.
Later in August, she played Elina Svitolina once more in the second round of the Rogers Cup in Montreal but suffered a serious ankle injury and was forced to retire. This injury kept her out of the game for two months including the US Open but she did reach her best ever ranking of No. 20 in the world, on 6 August 2018. Buzārnescu ended the year ranked 24.

2019
Buzărnescu began her 2019 season at the Brisbane International. She lost in the first round to eventual finalist Lesia Tsurenko. Seeded second and last year finalist at the Hobart International, she was defeated in the first round by Belinda Bencic. Seeded 25th at the Australian Open, she lost her first-round match to seven-time Grand Slam winner, two-time finalist, and former world No. 1, Venus Williams.

In February, Buzărnescu represented Romania in the Fed Cup tie against the Czech Republic. She lost both of her rubbers to Karolína Plíšková and Kateřina Siniaková. In the end, Romania still managed to win the tie over the Czech Republic 3-2. At the Qatar Ladies Open, she was defeated in the first round by 2016 finalist Jeļena Ostapenko. In Dubai, she lost in the first round to Sofia Kenin. Seeded fourth at the Abierto Mexicano in Acapulco, she won her first match of the season by beating Daria Gavrilova in the first round. She was defeated in the second round by Bianca Andreescu. Seeded 29th at the Indian Wells Open, she suffered a second-round loss at the hands of Daria Gavrilova. Seeded 30th in Miami, she lost in the second round to Alizé Cornet.

Buzărnescu started her clay-court season at the Charleston Open. Seeded 12th, she reached the third round where she lost to fifth seed, 2011 champion, and eventual finalist, Caroline Wozniacki.

2022
In January at the Australian Open, she lost her singles qualifying first-round match to Ysaline Bonaventure. In May at the French Open, she entered the main draw as lucky loser but lost in the first round to Madison Brengle. At Wimbledon, she entered the main draw by replacing Leylah Fernandez where she defeated first-time qualifier, 18 year-old Nastasja Schunk, in the first round.

Performance timelines

Only main-draw results in WTA Tour, Grand Slam tournaments, Fed Cup/Billie Jean King Cup and Olympic Games are included in win–loss records.

Singles
Current through the 2022 Prague Open.

Doubles

Mixed doubles

Junior Grand Slam tournament finals

Doubles: 1 (1 title)

WTA career finals

Singles: 3 (1 title, 2 runner-ups)

Doubles: 6 (2 titles, 4 runner-ups)

WTA Challenger finals

Doubles: 1 (runner-up)

ITF Circuit finals

Singles: 31 (23 titles, 8 runner–ups)

Doubles: 56 (34 titles, 22 runner–ups)

Head to head

Record against top 10 players
Buzărnescu's record against players who have been ranked in the top 10. Active players are in boldface.

Top 10 wins

Notes

References

External links

 
 
 

1988 births
Living people
Tennis players from Bucharest
Romanian female tennis players
US Open (tennis) junior champions
Grand Slam (tennis) champions in girls' doubles
Olympic tennis players of Romania
Tennis players at the 2020 Summer Olympics
21st-century Romanian women